Greenwater may refer to:

 Greenwater, California
 Greenwater, Washington
 The component of water footprint originating from rain. See Water use#Water_Footprint_Network_.28WFN.29

See also

 Green water